Paléorient is an international multidisciplinary journal dedicated to the prehistory and protohistory of southwestern and central Asia. Its aim is to promote discussions between prehistorians, archaeologists and anthropologists whose field of research goes from the eastern Mediterranean to the Indus, from central Asia to the Persian Gulf, as well as specialists of various disciplines related to the evolution of Man in his natural environment from the Palaeolithic period to the Early Bronze Age. Paléorient publishes biannually review papers, information notes and book reviews – mainly in English and in French, and some of the issues are thematic. Paléorient is an internationally recognized journal presently distributed in over 22 countries, it is the apposite media for presenting and discussing research progress in all the fields of prehistory and protohistory from the eastern Mediterranean to the Indus.

History 
Paléorient was founded in 1973 by Jean Perrot and Bernard Vandermeersch with the help of the Wener Gren Foundation and was first published by Klincksiek Editions (1973) and later by the Association Paléorient (1974-1975). In 1975 Paléorient became a journal of the CNRS (Centre National de la Recherche Scientifique); it is presently published by CNRS Éditions. Between 1973 and 1992 the Journal was taken in by the Laboratoire de paléontologie des vertébrés et de paléontologie humaine at the Université Paris VI, and from 1997 by the Maison de l’archéologie et de l’ethnologie René Ginouvès, which was renamed Maison des Sciences de l’Homme Mondes in 2020.

The idea of founding a journal dedicated to the prehistory and the protohistory of southwestern Asia was spawned among a group of various CNRS researchers exploring common thematics in several parts of the Near and Middle-East since the early sixties. Then, communication difficulties across borders were enhanced by the lack of publication means that could promote discussions between archaeologists and prehistorians, and with biologists, geologists, geophysicists, chemists. Paléorient has filled in this gap and continues to overcome these difficulties. For twenty years, researchers from around the world (Europe, Arab countries, Israel, US, central Asia, Australia, Japan) have been consistently publishing the results of their work as well as more theoretical synthetic papers on the most ancient past of this region. Paléorient has thus become a media in which various intellectual traditions and scientific trends meet.

Editorial policy 
Submitted manuscripts should be original and unpublished. Peer-reviewing is carried out by at least three reviewers (two specialists, one non-specialist) chosen among the Scientific and Editorial Committees and/or specialists of the subject if deemed necessary. Reviewers remain anonymous throughout the editorial process. Evaluation of the manuscript rests on both the reviewers’ expert assessments and Paléorient’s own evaluation grid (on-line). Accepted papers are published within a relatively short time frame given the rigorous and anonymous validation procedure of peer-reviewing which ensures Paléorient’s level of scientific excellence.

The entire journal is available online – with a two-year moving wall   ̶̶  through the public free portal Persée that was launched with the help of the French Ministère de l’Éducation nationale, de l’Enseignement supérieur et de la Recherche, where the most prestigious French journals in Humanities and Social Sciences can be found. There is also an online access to Paléorient through the Jstor platform (also with a two-year moving wall). Paléorient is currently awaiting admission to OpenEdition Journals.

Directors 

 1973-1994: Jean Perrot and Bernard Vandermeersch (Founders)
 1994-2004: Geneviève Dollfus 
 2004-2012: Éric Cocqueugniot
 2013-2019: Frédérique Brunet and Sylvain Soriano
 Since 2020: Victoria de Castéja and Martin Sauvage

References

External links
Daune-Le Brun O. and Tillier A.-M. (2015), « Early Paléorient, Middle Paléorient, Recent Paléorient » [archive], Paléorient, vol. 41(2), p. 5-7
Volumes of Paléorient in Persée [archive]
Volumes of Paléorient in Jstor [archive]
Notice of Paléorient in Mir@bel [archive]
Pôle éditorial de la MMSH Mondes [archive]

1973 establishments in France
2017 disestablishments in France
Ancient Near East journals
Annual magazines
Biannual magazines published in France
Defunct magazines published in France
English-language magazines
French-language magazines
German-language magazines
History magazines
Magazines established in 1973
Magazines disestablished in 2017
Magazines published in Paris